Paul Douglas Creek (born March 1, 1969) is a former Major League Baseball pitcher with a nine-year career from 1995 to 1997, 1999 to 2003, and 2005. He played for the St. Louis Cardinals, San Francisco Giants, Chicago Cubs of the National League and the Tampa Bay Devil Rays, Seattle Mariners, Toronto Blue Jays and Detroit Tigers of the American League.

Amateur
Creek attended Georgia Tech, and in 1990 he played collegiate summer baseball with the Cotuit Kettleers of the Cape Cod Baseball League. Upon being selected in the fifth round of the 1990 MLB draft by the California Angels, Creek opted to not sign with them, returning to the draft pool the following season.

Minor leagues
In , he was selected by the St. Louis Cardinals in the seventh round of the draft and was signed to a deal shortly thereafter. After signing a contract with the Cards, Doug Creek bounced around A ball in 1991 and 1992, playing for four teams (Hamilton, Savannah, Springfield, and St. Petersburg) in that span. He was used primarily as a starting pitcher. Despite some early career struggles with Hamilton and Savannah in 1991, his performance improved upon joining Springfield the following season.

Creek registered a career low 2.58 ERA to go along with his 4-1 won-loss record with the Springfield squad. He then continued his strong 1992 pitching with St. Petersburg and started each of the 13 games he appeared in, going 5–4 with a still impressive ERA at 2.82. After playing in AA and compiling a career record of 18–22 with a 4.00 ERA as a Double A pitcher, Doug had three separate stints playing with the AAA team out of Louisville. He alternated between Louisville and Arkansas, the AA team that was affiliated with St. Louis.

St. Louis Cardinals

After a solid showing at both the AA and AAA levels, the Cardinals decided it was time to see what Creek could offer to their big league team. On September 17, Doug Creek faced the Los Angeles Dodgers for his first taste of big league action. He threw one inning and struck out two batters as the Dodgers could not register a hit off Creek. He appeared in five more games for St. Louis, throwing a total of six innings in six games and did not permit any runs to score. After the 1995 year ended he was dealt in the off-season to the San Francisco Giants in a multi-player deal that also sent Rich DeLucia and Allen Watson to the Giants. The Cardinals received Royce Clayton and Chris Wimmer in return.

San Francisco Giants

Creek tried to pitch well for his new team and the then-27-year-old hurler threw 48 innings and finished the season with a 6.52 ERA in 63 appearances. He also had an 0–2 win–loss record. He spent the following season on the Giants AAA team in Phoenix where, in 25 games (18 of them starts), he went 8–6 with 2 complete games and 1 shutout. His showing at Triple A in  earned him a quick promotion back to San Francisco. He went 1-2 and compiled a 6.75 ERA, while striking out 14 of the batters he faced.

Hanshin Tigers

On November 7, 1997, the Chicago White Sox purchased Creek's contract from the Giants. Creek never played for the White Sox as his contract was purchased again less than a month later (December 4, 1997), this time by a team in Japan. The Hanshin Tigers of the Japan Central League bought his contract from Chicago and Doug went to play out the  baseball season in Japan. For the Tigers he split the season between the Central League and Western League teams spending the majority of the campaign with the Western League squad. In 17 games (16 starts) he went 9–1 with a 2.16 ERA for the Western League's Hanshin Tigers. Creek led the league in earned run average and strikeouts with 101. He was less stellar playing in the Central League though as he went 0–4 with 5.65 ERA in his 7 appearances.

Chicago Cubs

Doug Creek returned from his one-year stint in Japan by signing a contract with the Chicago Cubs on January 29, . He pitched most of the season with Iowa, then the AAA team for the Cubs. Doug went 7–3 in 25 games (20 starts) and held his ERA to 3.79. He was also able to pick up a save. Chicago decided to call up the southpaw and he struggled in the 6 games he pitched in ending the season with a 10.50 ERA.

Tampa Bay Devil Rays

On February 1,  the Tampa Bay Devil Rays signed Doug Creek to a contract, and Creek would play out the next two and a half seasons of his MLB career with the cellar-dwelling Devil Rays. In 2000, he saw action in 45 games (all in relief) as he posted a 1–3 mark for Tampa Bay. Creek also picked up his first (and only) career save to go along with his 4.60 ERA. The following season Creek was able to lower his earned run average to a 4.31 mark as he pitched in a career-high 66 games and had a won-loss record of 2–5. He also threw a career-high 62 innings.

Creek spent the first four months of the  regular season on the D-Rays where he appeared in 29 games winning two of them and dropping one. His ERA however was at a 6.27 clip. On July 24, Tampa Bay and the Seattle Mariners consummated a deal that sent Creek to Seattle for cash considerations.

Seattle Mariners

Creek played in 23 games for the Mariners going 1–1 with a 4.91 ERA. His 2002 combined totals were 52 games, 3–2 record, 55.0 IP, and a 5.82 ERA.

Toronto Blue Jays

In October 2002 Creek was signed by the Toronto Blue Jays to be a key member of their bullpen. However, things did not go as planned in the 2003 season as Doug pitched just 13 innings in 21 appearances to go along with his 3.29 ERA for the Jays, as he underwent Tommy John surgery in June 2003.

Back to the Cardinals

Creek was then signed in February , returning to the Cardinals. With St. Louis, he was only used as a reliever in Triple AAA, going 2–1 with a 4.71 ERA in 33 games for Memphis.

Detroit Tigers

The Detroit Tigers signed Creek in January  to add pitching depth to their roster. He played on the Tigers' AAA affiliate in Toledo pitching 28 games (1 start) as he chalked up a record of 2–2 to go along with an ERA of 4.61. Unlike in St. Louis, Creek was able to crack the lineup and appear in 20 games for the Tigers. He threw 22 innings in those 20 games for Detroit, finishing the year with a 6.85 ERA.

References

External links
, or Retrosheet, or Pura Pelota (Venezuelan Winter League)

1969 births
Living people
American expatriate baseball players in Canada
American expatriate baseball players in Japan
Arkansas Travelers players
Baseball players from Virginia
Chicago Cubs players
Cotuit Kettleers players
Detroit Tigers players
Durham Bulls players
Georgia Tech Yellow Jackets baseball players
Hamilton Redbirds players
Hanshin Tigers players
Iowa Cubs players
Louisville Redbirds players
Major League Baseball pitchers
Memphis Redbirds players
Nippon Professional Baseball pitchers
Pastora de Occidente players
People from Winchester, Virginia
Phoenix Firebirds players
San Francisco Giants players
Savannah Cardinals players
Seattle Mariners players
Springfield Cardinals players
St. Louis Cardinals players
St. Petersburg Cardinals players
Tampa Bay Devil Rays players
Tigres de Aragua players
American expatriate baseball players in Venezuela
Toledo Mud Hens players
Toronto Blue Jays players